Edward Coverley Kennedy (31 August 1879 – 23 November 1939) was a Royal Navy officer who is remembered as the captain of the armed merchant cruiser  who engaged the German battleships Scharnhorst and Gneisenau.

Early life and career 
Edward Coverley Kennedy was born on 31 August 1879 and entered the Royal Navy as a naval cadet in 1892.

Beginning his career in HMS Britannia, he first served at sea in 1894, rising to midshipman in 1895 and serving in that capacity in the China Station. His rise up the ranks continued, becoming sub-lieutenant in 1898 and lieutenant in 1900. In this period he saw service in the battleship , at the Royal Naval College, Osborne and in the flagship of the North America and West Indies Station.

Antrim was the flagship of Rear admiral William Pakenham, commander of the Third Cruiser Squadron.

First World War and later career 

During the First World War Kennedy was transferred to the battle cruiser  in 1916. However, he missed the opportunity to participate in the Battle of Jutland due to being in hospital at the time of the battle. During his time in the New Zealand, Kennedy was given the temporary command of the ship with rank of captain. His rank of captain was made permanent in 1917 but he remained as executive officer in the New Zealand upon the return of the captain. This remained the case until May 1918 when he was made captain of HMS Angora which was a minelayer converted from a merchant ship.

From the Angora he was placed in command of the Sixth Light cruiser Squadron's . In this period he was present to witness the surrender of the German High Seas Fleet. He commanded the Cassandra as part of the Allied Intervention in Russia. It was during this operation that she was sunk on 5 December 1918 by a sea mine in the Baltic with the loss of 11 of her crew. The wreck of HMS Cassandra was discovered in 2010 by the Estonian Navy.

In the period 1919–1920 he returned to the America and West Indies Station to command the light cruiser . On 7 July 1919 riots broke out in Kingston, Jamaica. Constance landed armed personnel and restored order following a confrontation on 18 July. During the hand-to-hand fighting five or six sailors from the ship were injured.

Kennedy and Constance also took part in quelling disturbances in Belize. Tuesday 22 July 1919 saw veterans from the British Honduras Contingant, recently returned from service in the Middle East, march through the Belize Town. They smashed the plate glass of the ten largest merchant stores before cutting the power to the town. This triggered a night of looting and violence. British officials telegraphed Constance for assistance. On Friday 25 July, Claude Smith had called a public meeting to discuss labour demands. The meeting was broken up when local police and Royal Marines from Constance arrived to arrest him.

Kennedy also saw service on land, commanding a battalion of naval reservists at Newport during a 1921 strike. Kennedy was placed on the retired list in 1921. This was done as part of economies recommended by the Geddes Committee. The committee was chaired by Sir Eric Geddes and the cuts dubbed the Geddes Axe. In retirement Kennedy worked for the Conservative Party. He was a political agent in Hemel Hempstead and in 1929 for the Wycombe Division in Buckinghamshire.

Second World War and HMS Rawalpindi 
With the outbreak of the Second World War 60-year-old Kennedy returned to serve in the Royal Navy. He was described in his obituary in The Times by a friend referred to there as R.B. who spoke of Kennedy's 'happiness and pride' upon being given command of the Rawalpindi. R.B. noted Kennedy as saying "They've given me some fine guns...and in this war, I'm going to use them". In a letter posted on 21 November 1939, Kennedy wrote 'I am as content as it is possible to be'.

The Rawalpindi served as part of the Northern Patrol enforcing the blockade of Germany. On 23 November 1939 at 15.30 the ship was sailing to the south-east of Iceland when an enemy ship was sighted. Kennedy is described as examining the scene through his binoculars and saying, "It's the Deutschland all right". Initial reports attributed the sinking of the Rawalpindi to the German ship Deutschland. However, these reports were later corrected to state that it was the battle-cruisers Scharnhorst and Gneisenau. Despite being hopelessly outgunned,  Captain Kennedy decided to fight, rather than surrender as demanded by the Germans. He was heard to say "We’ll fight them both, they’ll sink us, and that will be that. Good-bye".

Smoke floats were deployed with a view to the Rawalpindi making good an escape. However, a second German ship came into view to the starboard side. They called on the Rawalpindi to stop, when this was rejected they fired a shot across her bow. When the British ship continued the Germans engaged with their large guns and the Rawalpindi fired her six-inch guns in reply. The third salvo knocked out the Rawalpindi's electric system (which stopped the ammunition winches) and was followed by a salvo destroying the bridge and wireless room. After 30 to 40 minutes of bombardment, all guns were out of action and the Rawalpindi was well ablaze. She remained afloat until 20.00 when the ship capsized and sank with the loss of 263 men. Around 30 survivors were reported as being taken prisoner but 11 men were rescued by the armed merchant cruiser HMS Chitral.

For his gallantry Captain Kennedy was posthumously mentioned in despatches.

Personal life 
Kennedy was married to Rosalind Grant, daughter of Sir Ludovic Grant. They had two daughters and a son, Ludovic Kennedy who became a celebrated journalist. He was a keen hunter, known to be a crack shot and a fine fisherman. His friend R. B. noted in his obituary that 'with a dog at his heels, or with a rod in his hand he was in his element'.

References

External links
 image of HMS Rawalpindi at Imperial War Museum

1879 births
1939 deaths
Royal Navy officers of World War I
Royal Navy officers of World War II
Royal Navy personnel of the Russian Civil War
Royal Navy personnel killed in World War II
Captains who went down with the ship